The Academy of Management Review (AMR) is a peer-reviewed academic journal on management. According to the Journal Citation Reports, the journal's 2021 impact factor is 13.865, ranking it 3rd out of 226 journals in the categories "Management"  and 4th out of 155 journals in the category of "Business". Current editor-in-chief is Sherry M. B. Thatcher (University of Tennessee). The journal is indexed in Scopus.

AMR is one of the four general management journals that the UT Dallas uses to rank the research productivity of universities. Finally, AMR is on the financial times top 50 list with only six other management journals.

AMR, by contrast with other sister journals of the Academy of Management, only publishes conceptual and theory pieces in the field of management, organization studies and applied psychology.

References

External links
Official Website
Interim Manager

Business and management journals
Quarterly journals
Publications established in 1976
English-language journals